Richie Connor (born 1954 in Walsh Island, County Offaly) is an Irish former Gaelic footballer who played for his local club Walsh Island and, from 1975 until 1989, at senior level for the Offaly county team.  Walsh later served as manager of the Laois and Offaly senior football teams.

As a player Connor was captain of the Offaly team which won the All-Ireland Senior Football Championship title in 1982, denying Kerry a 'five in a row' title. He played at centre forward that day, having appeared as centre back in earlier years.

Richie's only All-Star award came in 1981.

Richie's first success was with the Erins Hope team that won the Dublin under-21 title in 1974.  He helped them retain the title in 1975 and also won an Offaly under-21 medal with Walsh Island in the same year.

With Walsh Island, Richie was part of the team that won six Offaly Senior Football Championship titles in a row from 1978 to 1983. He was captain in 1981 and 1983.

He was interviewed for the documentary Players of the Faithful.

Connor was appointed manager of the Offaly senior team on a three-year-term in 2008 but resigned in February 2009.

References

 

1954 births
Living people
All-Ireland-winning captains (football)
All Stars Awards winners (football)
Gaelic football managers
Irish schoolteachers
Leinster inter-provincial Gaelic footballers
Offaly inter-county Gaelic footballers
Walsh Island Gaelic footballers
Winners of one All-Ireland medal (Gaelic football)